United States gubernatorial elections were held on November 6, 1990, in 36 states and two territories. Most elected in these elections would serve for a 4-year term, while those in New Hampshire, Rhode Island, and Vermont would serve for a 2-year term. The elections coincided with the mid-term elections for the United States Senate and the United States House of Representatives. Heading into the elections, there were 20 seats held by Democrats and 16 held by Republicans. By the end of the elections, 19 seats would be held by a Democrat, 15 would be held by a Republican, and two would be held by other parties.

Notably, in these elections, there were two people elected from a third party: former Alaskan governor and Secretary of the Interior under President Nixon Walter Joseph Hickel was elected governor as a part of the Alaskan Independence Party, and former U.S. Senator Lowell Weicker of Connecticut won on A Connecticut Party's ticket. In addition to Weicker, two other U.S. senators were elected governors that year, Republican Pete Wilson of California and Democrat Lawton Chiles of Florida. The 1990 cycle saw six incumbent governors defeated. These were Republicans Mike Hayden of Kansas, Kay Orr of Nebraska, Bob Martinez of Florida and Edward DiPrete of Rhode Island, as well as Democrats James Blanchard of Michigan and Rudy Perpich of Minnesota.

In 1988, Arizona voters approved a runoff-style election following the impeachment of governor Evan Mecham.  Because no candidate received a majority (50%) of the vote in the November election, a run-off election occurred on February 26, 1991. This style of voting was later repealed in 1992.

Election results

States

Territories and federal district

Close states 
States where the margin of victory was under 1%:
 Michigan, 0.7%
 Nebraska, 0.7%

States where the margin of victory was under 5%:
 Illinois, 2.5%
 Texas, 2.6%
 Maine, 2.7%
 Connecticut, 2.9%
 Massachusetts, 3.3%
 Minnesota, 3.3%
 California, 3.4%
 Alabama, 4.2%
 Arizona, 4.8%

States where the margin of victory was under 10%:
 Oregon, 5.7%
 Vermont, 5.8%
 Kansas, 6.0%
 Alaska, 8.0%
 Georgia, 8.4%
 New Mexico, 9.4%

See also
1990 United States elections
1990 United States Senate elections
1990 United States House of Representatives elections

Notes

References